Veraldi is a surname. Notable people with the surname include:

Attilio Veraldi, Italian novelist
Dennis Veraldi, American CEO of the Port Authority of Allegheny County
Donato Tommaso Veraldi (born 1941), Italian politician
Lewis Veraldi, Ford Motor Company vice president